Haram Rud-e Sofla Rural District is a rural district (dehestan) in Samen District, Malayer County, Hamadan Province, Iran. At the 2006 census, its population was 9,194, in 2,405 families. The rural district has 17 villages.

References 

Rural Districts of Hamadan Province
Malayer County